Tinsukia Assembly constituency is one of the 126 assembly constituencies of  Assam a north east state of India. Tinsukia is also part of Dibrugarh Lok Sabha constituency.

Members of Legislative Assembly

 1957: Radha Kishen Khemka, Indian National Congress
 1962: Radha Kishen Khemka, Indian National Congress
 1967: Paramananda Gogoi, Indian National Congress
 1972: Paramananda Gogoi, Indian National Congress
 1978: Golap Borbora, Janata Party
 1983: Rajendra Nath Phukan, Indian National Congress
 1985: Shio Shambhu Ojha, Indian National Congress
 1991: Shio Shambhu Ojha, Indian National Congress
 1996: Sudhangshu Coomer De Sirkar, Indian National Congress
 2001: Rajendra Prasad Singh, Indian National Congress
 2006: Rajendra Prasad Singh, Indian National Congress
 2011: Rajendra Prasad Singh, Indian National Congress
 2016: Sanjoy Kishan, Bharatiya Janata Party
 2021: Sanjoy Kishan, Bharatiya Janata Party

Election results

2016 results

2011 results

See also

 Tinsukia
 Tinsukia district
 List of constituencies of Assam Legislative Assembly

References

External links 
 

Assembly constituencies of Assam
Tinsukia district
Tinsukia